Alexandra Udženija (born 8 November 1975) is a Czech politician of Serbian descent.

Biography
She studied economics at the University of Economics in Prague (VŠE) and other schools. In 2003 she joined the Civic Democratic Party (ODS) and represented the party in Prague municipal politics. In 2014, she became the deputy leader of ODS. She remained in the position until 18 January 2020 when she was replaced by Zbyněk Stanjura. In December 2020, Udženija replaced Jana Černochová as Mayor of Prague 2.

References

1975 births
Living people
Politicians from Prague
Prague University of Economics and Business alumni
Civic Democratic Party (Czech Republic) politicians
21st-century Czech women politicians
Czech people of Serbian descent
Politicians from Belgrade
Women mayors of places in the Czech Republic
Civic Democratic Party (Czech Republic) mayors
21st-century Czech politicians